Bantry railway station was on the Cork and Bandon Railway in County Cork, Ireland.

History

The station opened on 4 July 1881.

On 7 July 1887, an early morning mail train crashed through the buffers, killing the driver and seriously injuring the fireman. The enquiry concluded that the driver had been speeding.

Regular passenger services were withdrawn on 22 October 1892 when a new station, Bantry Town, was opened closer to the town centre.

Routes

Further reading

References

External links
 Eiretrains gallery – 21st century photos of former railway infrastructure in Bantry

Disused railway stations in County Cork
Railway stations opened in 1881
Railway stations closed in 1892
1881 establishments in Ireland
Railway stations in the Republic of Ireland opened in the 19th century